The 2014 AFF Championship qualification tournament was the qualification process for the 2014 AFF Championship, the tenth edition of the ASEAN Football Championship. It was held in Laos from 12 to 20 October 2014, and involved the five lower ranked teams in Southeast Asia. The format was a single round-robin tournament with the top two teams qualifying for the tournament proper.

Venues

Fixtures
 Times listed are local (UTC+7:00)

Goal scorers
4 goals

  Sok Chanraksmey
  Soukaphone Vongchiengkham

3 goals

  Khampheng Sayavutthi
  Kyaw Ko Ko
  Murilo de Almeida

2 goals

  Adi Said
  Ak. Fakharazzi Hassan

1 goal

  Mohd Shahrazen Said
  Chhin Chhoeun
  Khoun Laboravy
  Phoutthasay Khochalern
  Khonesavanh Sihavong
  Ketsada Souksavanh
  Kyi Lin
  Min Min Thu
  Nanda Lin Kyaw Chit
  Anggisu Barbosa
  Filipe Bertoldo
  Patrick Fabiano

References

Qual
2014 in Laotian football
2014
Qual
2014 in Cambodian football
2014 in Burmese football
AFF Championship qualification
2014 in Brunei football
AFF Championship qualification